Mihaela Buzărnescu was the defending champion, but lost to Daria Kasatkina in the first round.

Zheng Saisai won her first WTA singles title, defeating Aryna Sabalenka in the final, 6–3, 7–6(7–3).

Seeds 
The top four seeds received a bye into the second round.

Draw

Finals

Top half

Bottom half

Qualifying

Seeds

Qualifiers

Qualifying draw

First qualifier

Second qualifier

Third qualifier

Fourth qualifier

External links 
 Main draw
 Qualifying draw

2019 US Open Series
2019 WTA Tour
2019 Singles